Xiaoli is a town in southwestern Changqing District, Jinan, Shandong, People's Republic of China, located around  southeast of the Yellow River. , it has 57 villages under its administration.

See also 
 List of township-level divisions of Shandong

References 

Township-level divisions of Shandong